Rhino Rift is a cave near Charterhouse, in the Carboniferous Limestone of the Mendip Hills, in Somerset, England. The cave is part of the Cheddar Complex SSSI.

It is 253 m in length and reaches a depth of 147 m.

The cave was discovered in 1971 after a successful dig by members of the Wessex Cave Club. Previous digging by the University of Bristol Spelaeological Society had unearthed remains of extinct animals, hence the cave's name.

The cave is locked and access is controlled by the Charterhouse Caving Company.

Further reading
D. T. Donovan, R. D. Stride & A. M. Ap Simon, Rhino Rift Log: A record of the excavations from 9 Nov 1947 to 13 June 1948 (Excavation log including plans & sections, MS in 19 cm 8vo notebook), library of the University of Bristol Spelaeological Society

See also 
 Caves of the Mendip Hills

References 

Caves of the Mendip Hills
Limestone caves
Cheddar, Somerset